Sad Talvar (also Romanized as Sad Talvār) is a village in Pir Taj Rural District, Chang Almas District, Bijar County, Kurdistan Province, Iran. At the 2006 census, its population was 141, in 11 families. The village is populated by Azerbaijanis.

References 

Towns and villages in Bijar County
Azerbaijani settlements in Kurdistan Province